"Peaceful Easy Feeling" is a song written by Jack Tempchin and recorded by the Eagles. It was the third single from the band's 1972 debut album Eagles. The single reached No. 22 on the charts and is one of the band's most popular songs.  Glenn Frey sings the lead vocal, with Bernie Leadon providing the main harmony vocal (starting in the beginning of the second verse) and Randy Meisner completing this three-part harmony.

Background
Jack Tempchin wrote the song during a period in which he was performing at folk coffee shops around his hometown of San Diego. A friend had created a poster to advertise his performances, which included fake quotes from famous individuals attesting to Tempchin's talent, which landed in the hands of a shop owner in nearby El Centro. Tempchin slept on the floor of the club the night of his show, and wrote an early version of "Peaceful Easy Feeling" on the back of the poster. Back in San Diego, Tempchin was rooming in a communal-type home with other musicians when inspiration for completing the song hit.

During a following trip to Old Town San Diego State Historic Park, Tempchin saw a girl with "turquoise earrings against her dark skin," which he incorporated into the song. "I guess I was trying to distill the beauty of every girl I saw into words on paper and then into a song," he later stated. He later completed the song's third verse in the parking lot of the Der Wienerschnitzel fast food establishment in San Diego.

Some time later, Tempchin had moved to Los Angeles and was attempting to break into the music industry alongside Jackson Browne, Glenn Frey, and J.D. Souther. Frey heard Tempchin's "Peaceful Easy Feeling" and asked if he could develop it further, adding that his new band, the Eagles, had only just formed eight days prior. He presented Tempchin with a cassette demo on the track the next day, who later remarked, "It was so good I couldn’t believe it."

Billboard described the song as "a pop-flavored progressive country effort with lyrics that penetrate and stick in the mind."

Personnel 
 Glenn Frey – lead vocals, acoustic guitar
 Bernie Leadon – B-Bender electric guitar, harmony vocals
 Randy Meisner – bass, backing vocals
 Don Henley – drums, backing vocals

Cover versions
On the 1993 album Common Thread: The Songs of the Eagles, country music band Little Texas recorded a cover of "Peaceful Easy Feeling". This cover version charted at No. 74 on the U.S. Billboard Hot Country Songs charts and was later included on the band's 1995 Greatest Hits album.

B. W. Stevenson also recorded "Peaceful Easy Feeling" and released it on his 1972 album Lead Free (RCA Victor 4794) and later included it on his 1977 LP The Best of B. W. Stevenson (RCA Victor APL-1-2394).

Folk singer Kate Wolf included a slow, acoustic cover of "Peaceful Easy Feeling" on her 1982 live album Give Yourself to Love.

Country singer Vince Gill covered this song live at the Grand Ole Opry as a tribute to the late Glenn Frey.

1978 episode of HEE HAW Buck Owens and the Buckaroos performed on episode.

In 2017, Tristen released a digital single via Instant Records.

Chart positions

Weekly charts

References 

1972 singles
1993 singles
Eagles (band) songs
Little Texas (band) songs
Songs written by Jack Tempchin
Song recordings produced by Glyn Johns
Asylum Records singles
1972 songs